Misterbianco is a comune (municipality) in the Metropolitan City of Catania in the Italian region Sicily, located about  southeast of Palermo and about  west of Catania.  
  
Misterbianco borders the following municipalities: Camporotondo Etneo, Catania, Motta Sant'Anastasia, San Pietro Clarenza.

History
The settlement's name derives from a former local monastery in the contrada of Campanarazzu (pejorative of ), where monks, likely Dominicans, wore a white dress (in ). However, both the monastery and the settlement were destroyed by the 1669 Etna eruption. A new borough was therefore built in the former contrada of Milicia.

Until the mid-19th century Misterbianco was a small rural settlement. However, after a large industrial complex was built in the area, its population grew substantially, up to 18,836 in 1971 and 40,785 in 1991. The town continues to grow in size due to people moving here from the increasingly costly quarter of Catania city.

References

External links
 Official website